Cotinis subviolacea is a species of the Cotinis scarab genus. It was described by Hippolyte Louis Gory and Achille Rémy Percheron in 1833. It is found in the United States.

References

Cetoniinae
Beetles of North America
Beetles described in 1833